The Lavant Cup was a motor race held in the spring at Goodwood, England from 1949 to 1966. Over the years it was variously run for Formula 2, Formula 1 and, finally, Sports car racing classes, with the latter counting towards the British Sports Car Championship. The trophy is named for the near-by parish and villages of Lavant, which also give their name to the Lavant Straight on the circuit itself.

In recent years the race has been revived as a historic racing event, forming a part of the Goodwood SpeedWeek meeting.

Winners

References  

 
Sport in West Sussex